Megalith Records is a ska record label founded on August 22, 2002 and located in Norman, Oklahoma. It is owned by Robert "Bucket" Hingley of The Toasters and the defunct label Moon Ska Records, and managed by Jeremy Patton, current webmaster and graphic artist for the Toasters. Manufacturing duties are carried out by Brett of AtoZ Media Services, a CD pressing plant company based in New York City.

In addition to CDs and LPs, all of the label's releases are available from more than 50 digital download pay sites. The label has released more than 60 records. The label has released some digital-only albums and plans to continue this, many of which are releases that have been out of print for years, or have not had physical releases available in the United States. The label has struck a physical distribution deal with MVD Entertainment Group, for in-store CD product sales and distribution.

Bands 
 3 Minute Warning
 Babylove and the Van Dangos
 Betagarri
 The BiG
 The Bluebeats
 Bigger Thomas
 Bomb Town
 Channel One
 Deal's Gone Bad
 The Dendrites
 Deskarats
 Desorden Público
 Don Segundo
 Eastern Standard Time
 Fast Food Orchestra
 Hub City Stompers
 Kingston Kitchen
 King Django
 Los Furios
 Los Skarnales
 Mile 21
 Mr. T-Bone
 New York Ska-Jazz Ensemble
 Open Season
 The Palookas
 Pannonia Allstars Ska Orchestra
 The Pepper Pots
 RiceRokit
 Rotterdam Ska-Jazz Foundation
 Royal City Riot
 Royal Roost
 The Rudie Crew
 Ryan Scroggins And The Trenchtown Texans
 The Scorchers
 St. Petersburg Ska-Jazz Review
 The Toasters
 Two And A Half White Guys
 2Tone Lizard Kings
 Westbound Train
 Victor Rice
 The Void Union

See also
 List of record labels

References

External links
 Megalith Records
 Megalith Records Releases Catalog
 Megalith Records Artists Roster
 Megalith on allrecordlabels

American record labels
Ska record labels